The association football tournament at the 1984 Summer Olympics started on July 29 and ended on August 11. It was the first Olympic football competition in which professionals were officially allowed. Until then, the amateur-only rule had heavily favored socialist countries from the Soviet Bloc whose players were professionals in all but name. However, as agreed with FIFA to preserve the primacy of the World Cup, the Olympic competition was restricted to players with no more than five "A" caps at tournament start, regardless of age.

Group A

Chile
Head coach: Pedro Morales Torres

France
Head coach: Henri Michel

Norway
Due to the boycott of the Olympics, Norway took part in place of East Germany.
Head coach: Tor Røste Fossen

Qatar
Head coach:  Evaristo de Macedo

Group B

Cameroon
Head coach:  Radivoje Ognjanović

Canada
Head coach:  Tony Waiters

Iraq

Head coach:  Ammo Baba

Yugoslavia
The following is the Yugoslavia squad in the men's football tournament of the 1984 Summer Olympics.

Coach: Ivan Toplak

Group C

Brazil
Head coach:  Jair Picerni

Morocco
Head coach:  José Faria

Saudi Arabia
Head coach: Khalil Al-Zayani

West Germany
Due to the boycott of the Olympics, West Germany took part in place of the Soviet Union. 
Head coach: Erich Ribbeck

Group D

Costa Rica
Head coach:  Antonio Moyano

Egypt
Head coach: Mawser Fat'hi

Italy
Due to the boycott of the Olympics, Italy took part in place of Czechoslovakia. 
Head coach: Enzo Bearzot

United States
Head coach:  Alketas Panagoulias

References

External links
 FIFA

Olympics
1984 Summer Olympics